Ambroise Rendu (25 October 1778 – 12 March 1860) was a French educator and translator.

Principale publications 
Système de l'Université de France, ou Plan d'une éducation nationale, essentiellement monarchique et religieuse, formant le second supplément aux Observations sur le Discours de M. de Saint-Romain, concernant l'instruction publique et l'éducation (1816)
Essai sur l'instruction publique, et particulièrement sur l'instruction primaire (3 volumes, 1819)
De l'Instruction publique, et particulièrement des écoles chrétiennes, modèle de tous les perfectionnements actuels de l'instruction primaire (1819)
Code universitaire, ou Lois et statuts de l'Université royale de France recueillis et mis en ordre par M. Ambroise Rendu (1827)
Traité de morale à l'usage des écoles primaires (1834)
Considérations sur les écoles normales primaires de France (1838)
De l'Instruction secondaire et spécialement des écoles secondaires ecclésiastiques, ou de l'Alliance naturelle du Clergé et de l'Université pour l'éducation de la jeunesse (1842)
De l'Association en général et spécialement de l'association charitable des Frères des écoles chrétiennes (1845)
De l'Université de France et de sa juridiction disciplinaire (1847)
Cours de pédagogie, ou Principes d'éducation publique à l'usage des élèves des écoles normales et des instituteurs primaires Texte en ligne
Translations
Robinson dans son île, ou Abrégé des aventures de Robinson, à l'usage des écoles primaires (1846)
 Nouvelle traduction des Psaumes sur le texte hébreu (2 volumes, 1858)

1778 births
1860 deaths
French educators
French translators
Writers from Paris
French male non-fiction writers